Diora  is a genus of plants in the  Agavoideae. It contains only one known species, Diora cajamarcaensis, endemic to  Peru.

References

Agavoideae
Endemic flora of Peru
Plants described in 1942